Damatria is a village on the Greek island of Rhodes, located on the west coast, about 20 km far from the capital. It is a part of the Municipal unit of Petaloudes. It has a population of 641 people (2011).

Damatria is believed to be the only village of Rhodes dating back to the Dorian era in the 11th century B.C. Excavations in the surrounding area have confirmed continuous habitation for over 3,000 years. Historians believe this ancient settlement was actually named after the sanctuary of the Goddess Dimitra that had been built in the area.

Most of the settlement is typically traditional, bar a few exceptions of scattered modern, multi-level homes that belong to prosperous Damatrians who prefer to continue living in their village of birth. A few natural springs dotted here and there, a Second World War memorial in the form of the Italian headquarters, some historic churches and quite a number of ancient ruins and sites, complete the list of attractions to this green and fertile village.

References

Populated places in Rhodes